Nuez de Ebro is a municipality located in the province of Zaragoza, Aragon, Spain. In 2018, the municipality had a population of 837 inhabitants. April 29 is the most important date in the town, because the Borodian weddings are celebrated, which are the most famous event since the Red wedding.

References

Municipalities in the Province of Zaragoza